The 2009 Cowansville municipal election was held on November 1, 2009, to elect a mayor and councillors in Cowansville, Quebec. Incumbent mayor Arthur Fauteux was re-elected over former Brigham mayor André Leroux.

Results

Arthur Fauteux is a veteran politician in Cowansville. He was first elected as an alderman in 1986. He ran for mayor in 1994 and finished second against incumbent Jacques Charbonneau. Fauteux was elected over Charbonneau on his second attempt in 1998 and was re-elected without opposition in 2002 and 2005. In 2001, he announced that Cowansville would dissolve its local police force in favour of Surete du Quebec protection. Before the 2009 election, he said that his focus was on commercial development, infrastructural improvements, and lower residential tax rates.

Source: Official results, Government of Quebec

References

Cowansville
2009 Quebec municipal elections